PP-132 Nankana Sahib-II is a Constituency of Provincial Assembly of Punjab.

General elections 2013

General elections 2008

See also
 PP-131 Nankana Sahib-I
 PP-133 Nankana Sahib-III

References

External links
 Election commission Pakistan's official website
 Awazoday.com check result
 Official Website of Government of Punjab

Constituencies of Punjab, Pakistan